Paulo Sérgio Vieira Vasconcelos (born 2 July 1997) is a Portuguese footballer  who plays for C.F. União, as a defender.

Football career
On 30 July 2017, Vasconcelos made his professional debut with União Madeira in a 2017–18 Taça da Liga match against Gil Vicente.

References

External links

Portuguese League profile 

1997 births
Living people
Sportspeople from Funchal
Portuguese footballers
Association football defenders
C.F. União players